Soviet Occupation Day may refer to:
 Soviet Occupation Day, Georgia, to recall the Red Army invasion of Georgia in 1921
 Soviet Occupation Day, Moldova 
 Occupation of the Latvian Republic Day, to recall the Soviet occupation of Latvia in 1940